is an action video game released in 2004 by Konami. The game was released only in Japan. It is based on the manga Croket! by Manavu Kashimoto.

The GameCube version of the game is compatible with the GameCube - Game Boy Advance link cable.

References

External links
 Korokke! Ban-Ō no Kiki o Sukue 

Video games based on anime and manga
2004 video games
Japan-exclusive video games
GameCube games
PlayStation 2 games
Action video games
Konami games
Multiplayer and single-player video games
Video games developed in Japan
Games with GameCube-GBA connectivity